Turning the Tables may refer to:

Turning the Tables (history book), by  Andrew P. Haley
Turning the Tables: From Housewife to Inmate and Back Again, 2016 book by Teresa Giudice
Turning the Tables (film), a 1919 silent film
"Turning the Tables", the second episode of the documentary series Making a Murderer

See also
Table-turning, a type of seance
"Turning Tables", a song by Adele
"The Tables Turned", a poem by William Wordsworth